Siliștea Gumești is a commune in Teleorman County, Muntenia, Romania. It is composed of a single village, Siliștea Gumești. It was known as Siliștea Nouă from 1968 to 1996. 

Near Siliștea Gumești there is an abandoned air base; built in 1945–1947, the military facility operated MiG-15s.

Famous residents include the writer Marin Preda (1922-1980), considered the most important novelist in the post-World War II Romanian literature. The action of his novel, Moromeții, takes place at Siliștea Gumești.

External links
 Official site

References

Communes in Teleorman County
Localities in Muntenia